Ramanjit Singh Sikki is an Indian politician and belongs to the Indian National Congress. He is a member of the Punjab Legislative Assembly and represents Khadoor Sahib.

Family
His father's name is Sukhdev Singh.

Political career
Sikki was elected to the Punjab Legislative Assembly from the Khadoor Sahib constituency in 2012. He was the second-wealthiest candidate in the 2012 Punjab elections.

On 14 April 2017, Sikki uploaded a video allegedly threatening the local police to submit to the demands of his supporters or face consequences.

References

Living people
Indian Sikhs
Punjab, India MLAs 2012–2017
Year of birth missing (living people)
People from Tarn Taran district
Place of birth missing (living people)
Indian National Congress politicians
Punjab, India MLAs 2017–2022